General Grant was a 1,005-ton three-masted bark built in Maine in the United States in 1864 and registered in Boston, Massachusetts. It was named after Ulysses S. Grant and owned by Messers Boyes, Richardson & Co. She had a timber hull with a length of 179.5 ft, beam of 34.5 ft and depth of 21.5 ft. While on her way from Melbourne to London, General Grant crashed into a cliff on the west coast of main island of the Auckland Islands of New Zealand, and subsequently sank as a result. Sixty-eight people drowned and only 15 people survived.

Wreck
The ship departed Melbourne on 4 May 1866 bound for London via Cape Horn, under the command of Captain William H. Loughlin. It was carrying 58 passengers and 25 crew, along with a cargo of wool, skins, 2,576 ounces of gold, and 9 tons of zinc spelter ballast. Included in the passenger list were a number of successful miners from the Australian gold fields.

At 11pm on 13 May 1866, the Auckland Islands were sighted dead ahead. With only light winds, the crew were unable to change course, and eventually collided against the cliffs and drifted into a large cave on Auckland Island's western shore. The rising tide and increasing swell caused the main mast to hit the cave roof repeatedly until the mast forced a hole through the hull; the ship sank on 14 May 1866. Although the weather remained calm, the boats were not launched immediately on the ship entering the cave as it was very dark, there was no obvious landing place, and pieces of spars and rock were falling down continually.

Once daylight arrived the three boats on board were prepared for launch. The boats consisted of two quarter boats (each 22 feet long) and a long boat of 30 feet. One of the quarter boats was launched first and sent outside to see if landing could be made. The boat was expected to return for more people but instead waited outside the cave as no landing could be found. By this time the swell was increasing. The second quarter boat took a number of passengers and crew, including Mrs Jewell, to the first boat for transfer. The long boat was lying on the quarter deck and was filled with passengers. The ship was sinking fast and the long boat floated off General Grants decks. Unfortunately, the long boat was swamped with water just after getting clear of the ship. The second quarter boat stayed out of the danger area, but three people (David Ashworth, Aaron Hayman, and William Sanguily) were able to swim through the surf to the quarter boat. A total of fifteen people, including 9 crew and 6 passengers, survived the wreck. The captain did not leave the ship.

Passengers and crew
The list of those on General Grant includes:
William H. Loughlin of New York - Captain - Drowned at time of wreck
Bartholmew Brown of Boston - First officer - Lost at sea attempting to reach New Zealand
B. F. Jones of Massachusetts - Second officer - Drowned at time of wreck
Magnes Anderson of Sweden - Carpenter - Drowned at time of wreck
Keding - Steward - Drowned at time of wreck
William Newton Scott of Shields (also reported as W Newton Smith) - Able bodied seaman - Lost at sea attempting to reach New Zealand
William Ferguson - Able bodied seaman - Survived
Cornelius Drew - Able bodied seaman - Survived
Peter McNevin of Islay - Able bodied seaman - Lost at sea attempting to reach New Zealand
Andrew Morison of Glasgow - Able bodied seaman - Lost at sea attempting to reach New Zealand
David McLelland of Ayr, Scotland - Able bodied seaman - Died on the Island
Joseph Harvey Jewell - Able bodied seaman - Survived
William Murdoch Sanguilly - Able bodied seaman - Survived
Aaron Hayman (also reported as A. Harpman)- Ordinary seaman - Survived
Corn - Drowned at time of wreck
Purser - Drowned at time of wreck
Cook - Drowned at time of wreck
Assistant Cook - Drowned at time of wreck
Mrs Brown - Passenger (wife of First Officer, Bartholmew Brown)- Drowned at time of wreck
Mrs Mary Ann Jewell - Passenger (wife of Able bodied Seaman Joseph Jewell) - Survived. She is often reported as a stewardess but this is disputed. She did pay for her passage but had to sign articles of employment as a stewardess to accompany her husband - a member of the crew - but she did not act as stewardess. 
James Teer - Passenger - Survived
Frederick Patrick Caughey - Passenger - Survived
David Ashworth - Passenger - Survived
Nicholas Allen - Passenger - Survived
Mrs Oat and four children - Passengers - Drowned at time of wreck
Mrs Allen and three children - Passengers - Drowned at time of wreck
Mr & Mrs Oldfield and two children - Passengers - Drowned at time of wreck
Mr Laing - Passenger - Drowned at time of wreck
Mr Mitchell - Passenger - Drowned at time of wreck

Castaway
After the sinking of the ship and the capsizing of the long boat, the remaining two quarter boats pulled up outside the cave and decided to row for Disappointment Island. They reached there at dark and then the next day made for the Auckland Island and Port Ross. They arrived there after three days and two nights. After exploring, the group found two huts at Port Ross and, on 13 July 1866 Musgrave's hut. The group split in two in order to keep watch for passing ships. After nine months ashore, four of the crew decided to attempt to sail to  New Zealand in one of the quarter boats. They set sail on 22 January 1867 without a compass, chart, or nautical instrument of any kind and were never seen again. Another survivor, David McLelland, died of illness on 3 September 1867. He was 62.

The ten remaining survivors moved to Enderby Island, where they lived on seals and pigs. On 19 November, they sighted the cutter Fanny, but she did not see their signals. The brig Amherst noticed their signals on 21 November 1867 and rescued the group.

As a result of this shipwreck and two previous wrecks (Grafton and Invercauld), the New Zealand government established a network of castaway depots and regular visits by government vessels to the subantarctic islands to relieve further shipwreck victims.

From as soon as 1868, General Grants cargo of gold attracted numerous recovery attempts, several of which proved deadly for the wreck seekers, but the exact location of the wreck has yet to be confirmed.

References

Further reading

External links
 An Encyclopedia of New Zealand 1966: General Grant at Te Ara: The Encyclopedia of New Zealand
The Wreck of the General Grant at Maritime Archaeology Association of New Zealand
Images and objects relating to the General Grant shipwreck in the collection of the Museum of New Zealand Te Papa Tongarewa
Images of the survivors 

Barques
Shipwrecks of the Auckland Islands
1866 in New Zealand
1866 in Antarctica
1864 ships
Ships built in Maine
Maritime incidents in May 1866
Clippers